Castlecary railway station served the village of Castlecary, North Lanarkshire, Scotland from 1842 to 1967 on the Edinburgh and Glasgow Railway.

History 
The station opened on 21 February 1842 by the Edinburgh and Glasgow Railway. To the north was Castlecary Fireclay and Limeworks. To the southeast was the goods yard and the signal box. The signal box closed in 1966 station closed on 6 March 1967. Nothing remains.

See also 
 Castlecary rail accidents

References

External links 

Disused railway stations in North Lanarkshire
Railway stations in Great Britain opened in 1842
Railway stations in Great Britain closed in 1967
Beeching closures in Scotland
Former North British Railway stations